Eckartsau is a town in the district of Gänserndorf in the Austrian state of Lower Austria.

History 
Schloss Eckartsau was the last residence of Charles I of Austria prior to his departure from the former Austria-Hungary in March, 1919.

The present Eckartsau was formed in 1971 from the union of the market town Eckartsau with Witzelsdorf and the villages Kopfstetten, Pframa and Wagram.

Subdivisions 

 Eckartsau
 Kopfstetten
 Pframa
 Wagram an der Donau
 Witzelsdorf

See also 
 Schloss Eckartsau (de)
 Marchegger Ostbahn (de)

References

Cities and towns in Gänserndorf District
Croatian communities in Austria